Tachysphex pechumani is a species of wasp in the family Crabronidae. It is endemic to North America.

Sources

Crabronidae
Hymenoptera of North America
Insects of the United States
Taxonomy articles created by Polbot
Insects described in 1938